Aghcheh Dizaj (also Romanized as Āghcheh Dīzaj; and Āghchehdīzaj) is a village in Gavdul-e Gharbi Rural District, in the Central District of Malekan County, East Azerbaijan Province, Iran. At the 2006 census, its population was 2,023, in 533 families.

References 

Populated places in Malekan County